Baburao Algu Yadav (born 6 November 1982 in Chandrapur, Maharashtra) is an Indian cricketer who plays for Vidarbha cricket team and Railways cricket team and for Ahmedabad Rockets and Hyderabad Heroes in Indian Cricket League . He is right-hand batsman who can bowls right-arm medium balls.

References

External links
 
 

1982 births
Living people
Indian cricketers
Vidarbha cricketers
People from Chandrapur
Ahmedabad Rockets cricketers
Hyderabad Heroes cricketers